Habibi or Habeebi may refer to:

Literature
 Habibi (novel), a 1997 young-adult novel by Palestinian-American author Naomi Shihab Nye
 Habibi (graphic novel), a 2011 graphic novel by Craig Thompson

Music
Habibi (band), an American band
The Habibis, an Australian band
 Hakol Over Habibi, an Israeli band

Songs 

 "Habibi", a 2015 song by Azis
 "Habibi", a song by Booba from the 2015 album Nero Nemesis 
 "Habibi", a song in by De Staat from the 2009 album Wait for Evolution
 "Habibi", a song by the Swedish pop group Dolly Style during Melodifestivalen 2019
 "Habibi", a song by Maître Gims from the 2015 album Mon cœur avait raison
 "Habibi" (Now United song), 2020 by international band Now United featuring its Lebanese member Nour Ardakani  
 "Habibi", a song by Orange Blossom from the 2004 album Everything Must Change
 "Habibi" (Ricky Rich and ARAM Mafia song), a 2017 song 
 "Habibi", a song by the artist Rola Saad
 "Habibi", a song by System 7 from the 1991 album System 7
 "Habibi", a song by Tamino (Amir Moharam Fouad) from his 2017 Tamino EP
 "Habibi" (I Need Your Love), 2014 song by Shaggy/Mohombi/Faydee/Costi
 "Habibi (Je t'aime)", a song by Milk & Honey from the 2007 album Elbi
 "Habibi" (Sawah), a 2009 song by Ishtar
 "Habibi I Love You", a 2013 song by Ahmed Chawki featuring rapper Pitbull
 "Habibi Ya", a song by Mohamed Fouad from the 2005 album Habibi Ya
 "Habibi Yah Habibi, a Hebrew zemirot by Asher Mizrahi
 "Ya Habibi", a 2020 song by Mohamed Ramadan & Gims

People
 Habibi (surname)

Other uses
 Habibi (poet) (born 1470), Azerbaijani poet
 Habibi (horse), a racehorse
 El Habibi Mosque, a mosque in Tunisia
 Habibi Restaurant, a Lebanese, Middle Eastern, and Syrian restaurant in Portland, Oregon

See also
 
 Habib / Habeeb, male name
 Habibie (surname)
 Habibullah (disambiguation)